Mohamed Amine Ouadahi (born 8 July 1987, Aïn Defla, Algeria) is an Algerian boxer. At the 2012 Summer Olympics, he competed in the Men's bantamweight, but was defeated in the third round by Satoshi Shimizu of Japan.

References

Living people
People from Aïn Defla
Olympic boxers of Algeria
Boxers at the 2012 Summer Olympics
Mediterranean Games bronze medalists for Algeria
Competitors at the 2013 Mediterranean Games
Bantamweight boxers
1987 births
Algerian male boxers
Mediterranean Games medalists in boxing
21st-century Algerian people
20th-century Algerian people